Kampung Raja (or Kota Putera) is a mukim and capital of Besut District, Terengganu, Malaysia. It is one of the mukim in Besut and also the central administration here. A long time ago, a king lived here and his castle was built here, but now the castle has been moved to Muzium Kuala Terengganu and only an old castle that remained here called Istana Tengku Long. Although located in Terengganu, the people there speak Kelantanese Malay and are culturally Kelantanese.

Climate
Kampung Raja has a tropical rainforest climate (Af) with moderate rainfall from February to May and heavy to very heavy rainfall in the remaining months.

References

External links
 

Besut District
Mukims of Terengganu